The winners of the "Bollywood Movie Award -Best Dialogue"

See also
 Bollywood Movie Awards
 Bollywood
 Cinema of India
 moviesjaggat

References

External links
 Official Website with winners
 Site with Bollywood Dialogues

Bollywood Movie Awards
 moviesjaggat